William Wallace Maxfield (1916–1943) was a male cyclist who competed for England. During his years of competition he was known as Bill Maxfield.

Cycling career
Maxfield represented England and won a gold medal in the 10 miles scratch race at the 1938 British Empire Games in Sydney, New South Wales, Australia. He also competed in three other events; the Road Race, the 1,000 metres Match Sprint and the 1 km Time Trial.

In 1939, he won the British National Individual Sprint Championships at Herne Hill.

Personal life
He was a storekeeper by trade and lived in Hambrook Road, London during 1938. 

He was killed during in 1943 World War II, when serving as a Flight Lieutenant with 502 Squadron of RAF Coastal Command, and is commemorated at the Runnymeade Memorial.

He was the captain of Handley Page Halifax "D" of No. 502 Squadron RAF which took off from RAF St Davids at 1244 hours on 27 December 1943. The aircraft was part of an anti shipping strike in the North Atlantic and it was last seen over an enemy vessel at 1750 hours, and last heard from when it transmitted an SOS signal from 45° 48' N 13° 20' W at 1945 hours.

References

1916 births
1943 deaths
English male cyclists
Cyclists at the 1938 British Empire Games
Commonwealth Games medallists in cycling
Commonwealth Games gold medallists for England
Royal Air Force officers
Royal Air Force personnel killed in World War II
Military personnel from Sheffield
Medallists at the 1938 British Empire Games